Jacinthe Laguë is a Canadian actress from Montreal, Quebec. She is best known for her role in The Five of Us (Elles étaient cinq), for which she garnered a Genie Award nomination for Best Actress at the 25th Genie Awards.

References

External links

Canadian film actresses
Canadian television actresses
Actresses from Montreal
Living people
Year of birth missing (living people)